Dandya is an extinct genus of ray-finned fish belonging to the family Dapediidae. It contains one species, D. ovalis. It is known from the Late Triassic of Lombardy, Northern Italy.

References

External links
 Bony fish in the online Sepkoski Database

Dapediidae
Triassic bony fish
Late Triassic fish
Triassic Italy
Fossils of Italy
Triassic fish of Europe
Fossil taxa described in 1905